Tadatsune (written: 忠恒 or 忠常) is a masculine Japanese given name. Notable people with the name include:

 (1576–1638), Japanese daimyō
 (died 1031), Japanese samurai
 (1604–1636), Japanese daimyō

Japanese masculine given names